Emiliano José Pedrozo Cantarero (born July 6, 1972 in Argentina) is a former Argentine-born Salvadoran professional football player and currently manager.

Club career
Born in Argentina, Pedrozo joined his fellow countrymen Dionel Bordón and Marcelo Bauza at Salvadoran side FAS in 1994. He would live to play in El Salvador for the remainder of his career, playing for several First and Second Division sides.

In 2005, Pedrozo became the seventh player to score 100 goals in Salvadoran league history, and retired with 114 goals scored in the Primera División de Fútbol de El Salvador.

In 2010, Emiliano Pedrozo coached the Sub-18 Escuela Alemana of San Salvador football team and lead them to victory for two consecutive years.

International career
Pedrozo became a Salvadoran citizen in 2004 and made his debut for El Salvador in a November 2004 FIFA World Cup qualification match against Panama. The match proved to be his sole international game.

Titles

Manager stats

References

1972 births
Living people
Sportspeople from Lanús
Argentine emigrants to El Salvador
Naturalized citizens of El Salvador
Association football midfielders
Argentine footballers
Expatriate footballers in El Salvador
Salvadoran footballers
C.D. FAS footballers
C.D. Atlético Marte footballers
San Salvador F.C. footballers
C.D. Águila footballers
C.D. Luis Ángel Firpo footballers
A.D. Isidro Metapán footballers
Nejapa footballers